Shmil Ben Ari (born February 7, 1952) is an Israeli actor.

Biography
Born in Jerusalem, to a Sephardic Jewish family with parents who emigrated from Morocco and Tunisia. He studied at Beit Zvi.

As an actor, Ben Ari was the star of the award-winning TV series Meorav Yerushalmi (Jerusalem Mix), popular shows such as Hostages, Zinzana, Merhav Yarkon, Our Boys and Rechov Sumsum and films such as An Electric Blanket Named Moshe (for which he received an Israeli Film Academy Best Actor Award), Buzz, Life According To Agfa, Lovesick on Nana Street, Nina's Tragedies and Yana's Friends.

As a voice actor, Ben Ari performed the Hebrew voice of Shifu in the Kung Fu Panda franchise as well as Don Lino in Shark Tale.

Awards
 1994 Israeli Film Academy Award for Best Leading Actor – An Electric Blanket Named Moshe 2004 Israeli Television Academy Award for Best Actor in a drama – Meorav Yerushalmi 2008 Israeli Film Academy Award for Best Supporting Actor – Lost Islands''

References

External links
 
 

1952 births
Living people
Beit Zvi School for the Performing Arts alumni
Israeli male film actors
Israeli male stage actors
Israeli male television actors
Israeli male voice actors
Israeli people of Moroccan-Jewish descent
Israeli people of Tunisian-Jewish descent
Israeli Sephardi Jews
Jewish Israeli male actors
Male actors from Jerusalem
Israeli Mizrahi Jews
20th-century Israeli male actors
21st-century Israeli male actors